Tongxi Temple is a Buddhist temple located in Pingtang Subdistrict of Yuelu District, Changsha, Hunan, China.

History
The temple was built in 791 by Chan master Zhenlang, a disciple of Qingyuan Xingsi, under the Tang dynasty (618–907). At that time it bore the name "Xingguo Temple". Since Emperor Wuzong (814-846) believed in Taoism, he ordered to demolish Buddhist temples, confiscate temple lands and force monks to return to secular life. The temple was completely destroyed during the Great Anti-Buddhist Persecution.

The temple was built in the Song dynasty (960–1279) and renamed "Fulong Temple", and was smashed during wars in the late Ming dynasty (1368–1644).

In the Qing dynasty (1644–1911), Chan master Tianyan Yingshi led his disciples to rebuild the temple and changed its name to "Tongxi Temple". In 1874, Zeng Guofan was buried at Fulong Mountain behind the temple.

During the Republic of China, Tongxi Temple, Lushan Temple, Kaifu Temple, Gaoshan Temple, Shanglin Temple, Baoning Temple, Hualin Temple, and Lingyun Temple were collectively known as the "Eight Temples of Changsha". In 1944, the well-known poet-monk Wan Xiu died at Tongxi Temple.

During the ten-year Cultural Revolution the Red Guards had attacked the temple in 1966. Volumes of scriptures, historical documents, and other works of art were either removed, damaged or destroyed in the massive socialist movement. In 2005, when reading the Buddhist Annals of Changsha, Shi Rongchan saw the records of Tongxi Temple and wanted to visit the temple, but found that only two old Podocarpus macrophyllus and a Ginkgo biloba were left in front of the temple gate. He vowed to rebuild the temple under the Podocarpus macrophyllus. In 2005, with the support of Buddhist believers, Tongxi Temple was rebuilt and was officially opened to the public.

Architecture
In the 1960s, Tongxi Temple still had 108 rooms and houses, from the mountainside to the foot of Fulong Mountain, but during the Cultural Revolution, the Red Guards razed it to the ground.

After the reconstruction, now the extant buildings include the Free Life Pond, Four Heavenly Kings Hall, Mahavira Hall, Guanyin Hall, Buddhist texts library, Bell tower, Drum tower and other ring-rooms.

Gallery

Neighbouring area
Tomb of Zeng Guofan

References

Buddhist temples in Changsha
Tourist attractions in Changsha
2005 establishments in China
21st-century Buddhist temples
Religious buildings and structures completed in 2005